George Green  (born 12 November 1912) was a Welsh international footballer. He was part of the Wales national football team between 1938 and 1939, playing 4 matches.

Career

RCD Espanyol
Landing at Spanish club Espanyol on 29 August 1935, Green was the first Welshman to have played in Spain at the time, making his debut in a 1–1 tie with CF Badalona in the Catalonia Championship and showing good touches of the ball. It was in a 3–0 victory over Osasuna that the defender-cum-midfielder delivered his first goal, leaving to London where he planned to marry, take a vacation, and return to Spain; but, on account of the Spanish Civil War, he never went back to the country.

International
He played his first match on 16  March 1938 against Ireland and his last match on 21 May 1939 against France.

See also
 List of Wales international footballers (alphabetical)

References

1912 births
Welsh footballers
Wales international footballers
Place of birth missing
Date of death missing
Association football defenders
Association football midfielders